Tamrat Desta (1978 – 18 April 2018) was an Ethiopian singer and songwriter. He was best known for his two albums Anleyaym (2004) and Kanchi Ayebeltm (2008).

Life and career
Tamrat Desta was born in Bishaan Gurraacha  near Shashamane, Ethiopia in 1978. He was the second of three children, all boys. After some years in Tiqur Wuha, his family moved to Shashemene and later went to Awassa, where Tamrat completed high school.

In 1998, Tamrat moved to Dire Dawa to live with his guardian; while there, he began to perform as a singer.

In 1999, Tamrat relocated to Addis Ababa to pursue his music career. He released his debut album, Anleyaym in 2004. Most of the lyrics on this CD were written by Habtamu Bogale, and the melodies of six tracks were composed by himself. Tamrat released his sophomore album Kanchi Aybeltm in 2008, with reaching major achievements. In 2014, Tamrat released an album called Keza Sefer.

Death

On 18 April 2018, Tamrat went to a local clinic in Addis Ababa for seeking medical help for tonsillitis. After receiving a pain killer, he collapsed on his way to his home and was pronounced dead at the scene. Shortly after his death, several media outlets speculated that Tamrat died of medical error and the physician who treated was found responsible for his death.

Tamrat's funeral service was held at Holy Trinity Cathedral church in Addis Ababa on 19 April 2018 and was attended by thousands of fans and famous figures. He was the father of five children.

Discography
 Anleyaym (2004)
 Kanchi Aybeltm (2008)
 Keza Sefer (2014)

References

External links
A conversation with Tamrat Desta by AddisLive.com (audio file)

1978 births
2018 deaths
21st-century Ethiopian male singers
People from Southern Nations, Nationalities, and Peoples' Region